Cuvillier Verlag is a German-based international publisher for dissertations, habilitation, scientific monographs and brochures. There are also congress proceedings, special research reports, anthologies, commemorative publications, project reports, series of publications, brochures and e-platforms for organizations or other publications. It was founded in 1989 in Göttingen by Eric Cuvillier and Annette Jentzsch-Cuvillier. The publisher exports more than 7,100 titles (as of January 2016) in science and business. The spectrum of scientific publications includes all faculties of science, arts, and engineering. It is a family business, run by Annette Jentzsch-Cuvillier.

Publishing Program 
The more than 7,100 published titles are made available both in print and as e-books.

The main subject areas of the company are:
 Agriculture and agricultural sciences
 Chemistry
 Physics
 Economics
 Mechanical engineering and process engineering
 Electrical engineering
 Law Sciences

Cuvillier E-Collection 
The company's e-book platform  Cuvillier E-Collection , publishes current research.

External links 
 Website of the publisher

Academic publishing companies
Göttingen
Publishing companies of Germany
Companies established in 1989